WBDY was an AM daytimer station on 1190 kHz at Bluefield, Virginia. WBDY's last format was sports talk. At the time it went silent, it was owned by Triad Broadcasting, which Adventure Communications' stations had merged into earlier.

License history
Adventure Communications, Inc. was granted the original construction permit for this station on February 19, 1980. The station became licensed on June 17, 1981.

The station's callsign was changed from WCBV and WBDY on September 16, 1985; to WHYS on November 22, 1993; and back to WBDY on May 30, 1997.

WBDY went silent on February 1, 2009 for financial reasons, and notified the Federal Communications Commission on March 1, 2009. Triad asked for an extension of authority to remain silent in September 2009, and received authority in December 2009.

Triad surrendered the license for WBDY on February 1, 2010, citing "changes in circumstances", one day before the license would have terminated as a matter of law.

References

External links
 Station Search Details on the Federal Communications Commission website

Defunct radio stations in the United States
BDY
Radio stations established in 1981
Radio stations disestablished in 2010
Sports radio stations in the United States
BDY
2010 disestablishments in Virginia
1981 establishments in Virginia
BDY